Scott Allison (born 22 April 1972 in Winnipeg, Manitoba) is a retired professional ice hockey player. He was the first pick for the Edmonton Oilers in the 1990 NHL Entry Draft (17th overall), but never made the NHL.

Awards
Sekonda Face to Watch December 2001.
Named to the BISL Second All-Star team in 2002.

Career statistics

References

External links

1972 births
Augsburger Panther players
Bracknell Bees players
Canadian ice hockey centres
Cape Breton Oilers players
Edmonton Oilers draft picks
Grand Rapids Griffins players
Living people
Manitoba Moose (IHL) players
Moose Jaw Warriors players
National Hockey League first-round draft picks
Nottingham Panthers players
Pensacola Ice Pilots players
Ice hockey people from Winnipeg
Portland Winterhawks players
Prince Albert Raiders players
Prince Edward Island Senators players
Sheffield Steelers players
Wheeling Thunderbirds players
Wichita Thunder players
Canadian expatriate ice hockey players in England
Canadian expatriate ice hockey players in Germany